is a railway station on the Tadami Line in the city of Aizuwakamatsu, Fukushima Prefecture, Japan, operated by East Japan Railway Company (JR East).

Lines
Aizu-Hongō Station is served by the Tadami Line, and is located 6.5 kilometers from the official starting point of the line at Aizu-Wakamatsu Station.

Station layout
Aizu-Hongō Station has a one side platform serving a single bi-directional track. The station is unattended.

History
The station was absorbed into the JR East network upon the privatization of the JNR on April 1, 1987.

Surrounding area
 former Aizu-Hongō Town Hall
 Aizu-Hongō Post Office
 Tachikawa Minami Elementary School

 Fukushima Prefectural Route 72
 Fukushima Prefectural Route 128
 Fukushima Prefectural Route 130
 Fukushima Prefectural Route 219

See also
 List of railway stations in Japan

References

External links

 JR East Station information 

Railway stations in Fukushima Prefecture
Tadami Line
Railway stations in Japan opened in 1926
Aizuwakamatsu